Samuel Plouhinec (born 5 March 1976) is a French former road bicycle racer. He won stage 4 of the 2005 Tour de l'Ain.

Major results

1996
 1st  Road race, National Under-23 Road Championships
 2nd Paris–Tours Espoirs
2000
 1st Stage 2 Ronde de l'Oise
 2nd Paris–Troyes
 10th Overall Tour de l'Ain
1st Stage 2
2002
 1st Grand Prix Cristal Energie
 10th Classic Loire Atlantique
2003
 1st Grand Prix Cristal Energie
 1st Mountains classification, Tour du Limousin
2005
 2nd GP de Villers-Cotterêts
 3rd Overall Tour de l'Ain
1st Stage 4
 6th Polynormande
 9th Overall Tour du Limousin
2006
 9th Overall Route du Sud
2007
 7th Grand Prix Cristal Energie
 8th Polymultipliée Lyonnaise
2008
 1st Trio Normand (with Nicolas Edet & Benoît Jarrier)
 2nd Grand Prix des Marbriers
 4th Grand Prix Cristal Energie
2009
 1st  Road race, National Amateur Road Championships
 1st Stage 3 Boucles de la Mayenne
 4th Overall Les 3 Jours de Vaucluse
2011
 2nd Overall Boucle de l'Artois
 10th Overall Boucles de la Mayenne
2014
 1st Stage 3 Tour du Jura
2015
 UCI Masters Road World Championships (35-39)
1st  Road race
3rd  Time trial
2017
 UCI Masters Road World Championships (40-44)
1st  Road race
1st  Time trial
 2nd Overall Boucle de l'Artois

Tour de France Participations 
2006 - DNF

External links

1976 births
Living people
French people of Breton descent
French male cyclists
Sportspeople from Le Mans
Cyclists from Pays de la Loire